Bonfield is a village in Kankakee County, Illinois, United States. Bonfield's population was 382 at the 2010 census. It is included in the Kankakee-Bradley, Illinois Metropolitan Statistical Area.

Although founded by a quarryman, Thomas Verkler, the village was named after Thomas Bonfield, an attorney for the Kankakee & Seneca Railroad Company, which established a depot in the village. The railroad has long since disappeared into history but it had been on Johnson Street. Old railroad spikes and ties might still be found around the limestone quarry. The depot was moved about a mile and a half south of the village and converted to a barn, which remained in December 2007. The town had a high school, but it burned down in the early 1930s. Students then went to Herscher High School in Herscher.

Geography
Bonfield is located in western Kankakee County at  (41.147190, -88.058219).

Demographics

At the 2000 census, there were 364 people, 122 households and 102 families residing in the village. The racial make-up of the village was 98.35% White and 1.65% from two or more races. Hispanic or Latino of any race were 1.37% of the population.

There were 122 households, of which 46.7% had children under the age of 18 living with them, 73.0% were married couples living together, 10.7% had a female householder with no husband present, and 15.6% were non-families. 13.9% of all households were made up of individuals and 5.7% had someone living alone who was 65 years of age or older. The average household size was 2.98 and the average family size was 3.26.

32.1% of the population were under the age of 18, 6.0% from 18 to 24, 32.7% from 25 to 44, 19.2% from 45 to 64 and 9.9% were 65 years of age or older. The median age was 33 years. For every 100 females, there were 90.6 males. For every 100 females age 18 and over, there were 90.0 males.

The median household income was $49,722 and the median family income was $55,972. Males had a median income of $45,833 and females $24,000. The per capita income was $18,531. About 2.8% of families and 2.6% of the population were below the poverty line, including none of those under the age of eighteen or sixty-five or over.

Popular culture
At a time when payphones could normally be found anywhere, the single payphone in town, near the corner outside the town's only gas station and a portion of the main street, was seen in the opening scenes of The Hunter, Steve McQueen's last movie. It was mentioned in the Kankakee County Journal at the time of filming in summer 1979.

References

External links
Official website

Villages in Kankakee County, Illinois
Villages in Illinois